The Unitary Democratic Coalition (CDU) is an electoral and political coalition between the Portuguese Communist Party and the Ecologist Party "The Greens" (Portuguese: Partido Ecologista "Os Verdes" or PEV). The coalition also integrates the political movement Democratic Intervention.

The coalition was formed for the first time in 1987 in order to run to the simultaneous legislative election and European Parliament election that were held on July 19 of that year.

Since the beginning of the coalition, the member parties have never participated separately in any election. The Communist Party is the major force inside it and has the majority of places in the electoral lists, however, the Greens also have an important presence, for instance, electing 2 members of parliament among the 17 elected by the coalition in the 2015 legislative election. Each party has its own parliamentary group and counts as a separate party in official issues. In the 2022 Portuguese legislative election, the Greens failed to elect any representatives.

At a local level, the coalition usually presents lists in almost every municipality and both Communists and Greens may occupy first place on the lists. As the Greens have a smaller structure, the offices of the Communist Party are used as offices of the coalition.

The coalition supported the minority Socialist Costa Government (2015–2019) with a confidence and supply agreement.

Symbol
The present symbol of CDU shows the PCP's symbol and the PEV's symbol, a hammer and sickle and a sunflower, respectively, with the respective names below. That symbol replaced a former one that featured three hexagons with the inscription: CDU and was often used with a beehive. That was sometimes said to mean that CDU worked just like a bee (collectively and every day) and the hexagons were meant to represent the cell-based Leninist organization of the PCP.

Youth organization
The coalition has a youth wing, called Juventude CDU, that develops political work in youth related subjects, along with youth-oriented activities, mainly during the electoral campaigns. The Juventude CDU is mainly composed by members of the youth wings of the parties that compose the CDU,  the Portuguese Communist Youth and the Ecolojovem.

Electoral results achieved by CDU

Assembly of the Republic

Vote share in the Portuguese legislative elections

European Parliament

Regional Assemblies

Local elections

Notes

References

External links
CDU Official Site
Portuguese Communist Party Official Site
"The Greens" Official Site

1987 establishments in Portugal
Communist parties in Portugal
Ecosocialist parties
Euroscepticism in Portugal
Left-wing political party alliances
Political parties established in 1987
Political party alliances in Portugal
Portuguese Communist Party